Dramatic Need is a UK-registered charity (number 1119443) that sends international arts professionals (such as musicians, artists and actors) to host workshops in underprivileged and rural communities in Africa. The charity promotes creative expression as a tool for conflict resolution, social development, gender empowerment and the assimilation of health messages in underprivileged communities.

Dramatic Need also provides art, music and film-making equipment to schools in South Africa and Rwanda. Volunteers on the Dramatic Need programme work with the children towards producing a performance or exhibition based on the issues that directly affect their communities. The charity has been particularly effective in encouraging young people to discuss and challenge the stigma surrounding HIV/AIDS. The Official Patron of Dramatic Need is Her Excellency Dr. Lindiwe Mabuza, former South African High Commissioner to the United Kingdom of Great Britain and Northern Ireland. The Board of Trustees includes the Oscar-winning film director Danny Boyle and South African-born actor Sir Antony Sher.

In an article for The Times in the United Kingdom on 11 November 2008, Dramatic Need trustee Danny Boyle described the charity's aims:

.
Significant supporters of the charity include Josh Hartnett, Helena Christensen and David Walliams. Hartnett has stated that he wishes to volunteer for Dramatic Need in the future.

On 14 November 2010, Dramatic Need sponsored the one time production of The Children's Monologues, directed by Danny Boyle. Held at the Old Vic Theatre in London, it featured the adapted stories of children’s first-hand experiences in South Africa being retold and re-interpreted by and performed by actors such as Sir Ben Kingsley, Benedict Cumberbatch, Tom Hiddleston, Gemma Arterton and Eddie Redmayne.

See also
The Children's Monologues

References

External links 
 

Children's charities based in the United Kingdom
Companies established in 2005